Giovanni Filoteo Achillini (Latin Joannes Philotheus Achillinus; 1466–1538) was an Italian philosopher.

Born in Bologna, he was the younger brother of philosopher Alessandro.

He applied himself to Greek, Latin, theology, philosophy, music, antiquities, jurisprudence, poetry, etc., but did not excel in any specific field. His poetry is the most noteworthy of his work; written in what has since been considered the bad taste that prevailed at the end of the 15th century, however, his works have left scarcely any memory of their existence but their titles. One of the principal was titled Viridario and contained the eulogy of many of his contemporaries in literature, with lessons of morality. He also wrote some remarks on Italian to the disparagement of Tuscan, and the praise of Bolognese, which he had used in his poems. Of antiquities, he had accumulated ample collections.

See also 
 Claudio Achillini, his grandson

References

Footnotes 

1466 births
1538 deaths
Italian antiquarians
16th-century Italian jurists
Linguists from Italy
16th-century Italian musicians
16th-century Italian poets
16th-century male writers
Italian male poets
Writers from Bologna
16th-century Italian philosophers
Italian male non-fiction writers